No Way Out: In Your House was the 20th In Your House and inaugural No Way Out professional wrestling pay-per-view (PPV) event produced by the World Wrestling Federation (WWF, now WWE). It took place on February 15, 1998, at the Compaq Center in Houston, Texas and was presented by Western Union. Seven matches were contested at the event.

This was one of the In Your House events which later became the title of an annual pay-per-view, replacing the method at the time of making new names for all events aside from the "Big Five" (Royal Rumble, WrestleMania, King of the Ring, SummerSlam, and Survivor Series). It was also the last In Your House event to have the In Your House banner around the ring. However, because later events did not take place in Texas, the event's name was truncated to "No Way Out" and was not reinstated until 2000, becoming the annual February PPV until 2009, after which, only one further event was held, which was in June 2012.

Shawn Michaels did not appear in the main event as advertised, owing to a severe back injury that resulted in his first retirement after the following month's WrestleMania XIV. He was replaced by Savio Vega.

This was the last event to feature visible In Your House branding on the ring apron and the upper reaches of the venue.

Production

Background
In Your House was a series of monthly pay-per-view (PPV) shows first produced by the World Wrestling Federation (WWF, now WWE) in May 1995. They aired when the promotion was not holding one of its then-five major PPVs (WrestleMania, King of the Ring, SummerSlam, Survivor Series, and Royal Rumble), and were sold at a lower cost. No Way Out of Texas: In Your House was the 20th In Your House event and took place on February 15, 1998, at the Compaq Center in Houston, Texas.

Storylines
Due to jealousy over his wife and valet, Sable, receiving all the attention of the audience, Marc Mero sought to annoy the crowd by sending Sable from ringside and instead being accompanied by The Artist Formerly Known as Goldust who first dressed up as Sable and then later, in a nod to the popular song "The Beautiful People", as Marilyn Manson. Metalheads and cross dressers The Headbangers, took exception to this.

During WWF Shotgun Saturday Night, the contender Pantera (wrestler) getting ready for a moonsault on Brian Christopher who managed to get up and attack Taka Michinoku, then lay him down for the moonsault. It turned out to be a ploy as the next week Christopher and Pantera tagged up against Taka and Aguila. During the match Christopher tried to use a foreign object against Taka but it was kicked out of his hands; Pantera quickly picked it up and put it inside his mask, making use of it by tagging himself in and performing a diving head butt to take the pin.

Two Saturdays previous to the event, The Godwinns interrupted The Quebecers' match, causing them a loss by hitting them with a slop bucket; the Quebecers took revenge the following week by attacking Henry on the outside, distracting Phineas in the ring giving Savio Vega a chance to hit a spinning heel kick and win the match.

The NWA presence continued to be felt in the WWF, proposing respect for tradition whilst letting Jim Cornette's tennis racket assist them in winning matches. In a match against North American Champion Jeff Jarrett, The New Blackjacks found themselves torn apart when Barry Windham mistimed a lariat and hit team-mate Justin "Hawk" Bradshaw when trying to aid him from interference from Cornette and The Rock 'n' Roll Express. This turned out to be not so accidental as after the match, he attacked Bradshaw again and declared alliance with his origins in the NWA. Windham appeared the next week without his facial hair, severing ties with Bradshaw, but after winning a match with Jeff Jarrett against Legion of Doom, his former team mate rushed the ring and chased away the NWA contingent. Accepting a challenge from the tag team, Bradshaw revealed his partner to be Flash Funk who offered little assistance once the Express took him out behind the referee's back leading Bradshaw to fight an effective handicap match. Despite winning the match, he suffered a post-match beat down after being hit with Cornette's tennis racket and suffered a four-man elevated neck breaker followed by a figure-four leg lock, with the Express stretching his arms and Windham – now sporting blond hair, further separating his image with Bradshaw – striking with a running bodysplash.

At the Royal Rumble, Ken Shamrock was awarded the Intercontinental Championship, defeating Rocky Maivia, despite The Rock using a foreign object. However, the decision was reversed immediately after the match when Rocky told the referee it was he who had been hit with the brass knuckles and subsequently the match was re-awarded to Rocky Maivia which made Shamrock deliver a belly-to-belly slam on referee Mike Chioda. Later that night, Kama Mustafa was entering the Royal Rumble match as Ahmed Johnson was exiting and Mustafa shoved Johnson, reigniting a longstanding feud between Johnson and the Nation of Domination. The following week on Raw is War a match between the Nation and Disciples of Apocalypse went to a double disqualification. In a tag match between Rock & Faarooq and Shamrock & Chainz, outside brawling between the two gangs distracted the referee whilst Rock hit Shamrock with a steel chair to steal the match away from him.

In a Royal Rumble rematch, Vader was taking on The Artist Formerly Known as Goldust when the lights went out and Kane interrupted, delivering a tombstone piledriver to the 450 lb wrestler. The following week, Vader returned the favor by attacking Kane in the ring, spraying him with a fire extinguisher to taunt him over his burns and to try to blind his one good eye. Paul Bearer later revealed his disgust at hearing Vader's catchphrase "It's time, it's time, it's time", and presented a Vader clock which he handed to Kane as it spontaneously set on fire.

The eight-man main event was the result of several interlinking feuds. As winner of the Royal Rumble, Stone Cold Steve Austin earned the right to a WWF World Heavyweight Championship match at WrestleMania XIV against incumbent Shawn Michaels. Following the Montreal Screwjob, Owen Hart disappeared from WWF programming only to reappear at In Your House: D-Generation X attacking Michaels. He then went on to attack Triple H, demanding a match for his European Championship, which Hunter declined on the grounds of a fractured kneecap injury. Hunter eventually agreed to the match on January 26's Raw is War; he sent down the Artist Formerly Known as Goldust (who was dressing up in various disguises each week) with the belt and Luna Vachon as Chyna. After Hart won the match, WWF Commissioner Slaughter declared the disguise so convincing, that he upheld the decision and Owen won the belt. After tormenting the New Age Outlaws, the hardcore tag team of Cactus Jack and Chainsaw Charlie opened Raw with a match to display the king of hardcore wrestling but after Jack elbow dropped Charlie inside a dumpster the Outlaws appeared, locked the dumpster shut and wheeled it off the stage, resulting in the pair being hospitalized. The two reappeared later in the night after Austin's match with Road Dogg ended in disqualification by virtue of interference from D-Generation X, who tied Austin up in the rings until Jack and Charlie came to his aid. The week before the event Austin stole the championship belt and locked up Los Boricuas, who were employed to help retrieve it. Following a stand off the ring between Austin and DX with the Outlaws, Chainsaw Charlie chainsawed his way from below the ring, appearing with Cactus Jack and Hart ran in through the crowd.

Event

Jim Ross revealed at the beginning of the pay-per-view that Shawn Michaels would not be taking part in the eight-man tag match main event due to injuries he had sustained during a casket match with The Undertaker the month before. JR also announced that owing to the heated nature of the fight, the WWF did not want to accept any responsibility for the bout, making it an unsanctioned match.

After making their way to the ring, Marc Mero announced there was only room for one sexy lady at ringside and sent Sable to the back, despite the protestations of the audience. Mero's initial dominance was soon overturned by The Headbangers fluid teamwork which included some abuse of the rules, despite not being the heel team. The tables were turned when TAFKA Goldust helped Thrasher over the top rope and Luna Vachon opened him up on the steel steps with the referee distracted. Sable returned during the match, making a beeline for Luna allowing the Headbangers to swap places (Mosh having suffered a TKO from Mero) and steal a victory, playing possum, with an inside cradle. After the match Mero, Goldust and some officials had to restrain the fighting Divas. After Goldust and Luna left, Sable shoved Mero to the floor.

Sunny made her way to the ring as the guest ring announcer. During the Light Heavyweight Championship bout, Brian Christopher made his way down to ringside and was invited to join the commentary team by Jerry Lawler. Pantera and Taka Michinoku exchanged offense until Pantera was thrown out of the ring and Taka threw himself out with a springboard crossbody from the top rope. The highflying continued with Pantera delivering a diving spinning hurricarana to Michinoku from the apron to ringside before Pantera applied some submission holds including a chickenwing stretch and trying to pin him with a modified STF submission. Taka managed to kick out of a moonsault, and rolled out of a second attempt, building some attacking maneuvers until he landed the Michinoku Driver for the win. After the match Christopher went to enter the ring but as Jerry Lawler tried to stop him, Taka took both down with a crossbody to the outside of the ring and then escaped through the crowd.

The tag team match between The Quebecers and The Godwinns began with much technical wrestling, a mixture of shoulder barges, arm twists and armbar take downs. The Godwinns isolated Jacques, frequently double teaming him in the corner which eventually led to their undoing as the referee reprimanded Henry Godwinn, allowing Pierre to break the deadlock. This amounted to little though as the illegal man Henry hit Pierre with a clothesline, forced into it by Phineas Godwin, from the apron which led to the pin. Feeling cheated, The Quebecers held their hands up in celebration after that match and were struck from behind with slop buckets for their effort.

Justin "Hawk" Bradshaw came to the ring in Texan attire, with leather chaps, a cowboy hat and bull whip. After chasing the NWA team, Howard Finkel informed the crowd that aside from Cornette, who possesses a manager's license, Jeff Jarrett's accomplices must leave the ringside. After flailing Jarrett with the chaps the match was officially underway and before long Jarret soon left the ring for support from his manager; Bradshaw took a disliking to this and slid out of the ring, banging the pair's head together. Upon reentering the ring Jarret took the advantage with Cornette aiding him outside the ring. Midway through the match, Jarrett began to focus on Bradshaw's knee, delivering low kicks and elbow drops to it. The match began to even up when Bradshaw caught his opponent in a diving crossbody and turned it into a fall away slam. Following an exchange of fists, Jarrett suffered a powerbomb and, hoping to stall the pin, Cornette made his way to the apron. Bradshaw pulled him into the ring and Irish whipped him into Jarret after which the referee tried to remove Cornette from the ring. Believing the referee to not see, Jarrett hit Bradshaw with Cornette's tennis racket but the match was stopped by disqualification. As Mike Chioda reprimanded Jarrett, Bradshaw stole the racket from him and struck him down and all of the NWA members who ran back to ring side, eventually giving Cornette a power slam. The NWA began to team up on Bradshaw again until Legion of Doom ran out and helped Bradshaw chase the NWA.

The ten-man "War of Attrition" began with D'Lo Brown taunting the audience with his fist. When Mark Henry entered the ring, he demanded Ahmed Johnson to be tagged, the latter picking up the 400 lb wrestler and body slamming him; Brown responded by delivering the Lo Down from over half the ring away but would later miss a moonsault on Skull. Both teams, particularly the Nation, frequently tagged all their members in and out until Rocky Maivia and Ken Shamrock met for the second time causing all ten men to break through the ropes into the ring for a mass brawl. Eventually they all fell out to brawl at ringside, leaving Chainz to deliver a spinebuster to Faarooq and the legal man Shamrock struck a belly to belly slam to Maivia, following up immediately with an anklelock causing the Intercontinental champion to tap out. After the match Rock and Faarooq shared words, with The Rock shoving his leader and walking out, but Faarooq demand he return to the ring, upon which point the Nation saluted the audience with their fists.

Vader attacked Kane before he had time to detonate his pyro, but the brawl quickly turned into Kane's favor, isolating his opponent in the turnbuckle before suplexing him. Vader took much punishment for the beginning of the match, succumbing to a DDT before eventually fighting back, punching Kane from the turnbuckle and turning the match in his favor by kicking Kane in the groin to prevent a chokeslam attempt. Vader capitalized by slamming his opponent to the mat and then using a moonsault from which Kane almost immediately sat up. The fight went to the outside of the ring, where Vader began to spray a fire extinguisher in Kane's face, using his disorientation to powerbomb Kane. Kane once again sat up and grabbed Vader by the throat, chokeslamming him and then finishing him with a tombstone piledriver. After the match Kane struck Vader with a wrench, leading to an EMT team wheeling him out on a gurney.

The majority of wrestlers in the main event came to the ring with some form weapons, including the last-minute replacement for Shawn Michaels: Savio Vega. Although Austin began the match with a Lou Thesz press on Billy Gunn, soon everybody was in the ring attacking each other with baking trays and trash can lids. Austin soon set to work on Triple H, strangling him with a broomhandle by the announce table while Cactus Jack and Chainsaw Charlie took it in turns to avenge themselves on Road Dogg, and then helping Owen Hart powerslam Gunn through a table and locking him with a sharpshooter. Helmsley began to brawl with Hart, the two exchanging weapon shots and ending up on the side of the ring. Soon after, Road Dogg powerbombed Charlie through two chairs, the shock of which helped the referee shape the match into a traditional tag match, in place of the bedlam style that it had previously been, although the D-Generation X contingent frequently flouted the rules with the referee distracted to isolate Charlie who took many shots to the head. Cactus Jack managed to break the hold on Charlie, taking the attack to the other team with a series of double-arm DDT, smashing Billy Gunn through a table and delivering a double Mandible Claw to both Outlaws. A Cactus clothesline, however, allowed his adversaries to take the advantage, smashing him with steel steps, with Vega wrapping Jack's hands and then face in barbed wire, before taking chair shots from every team member until he ducked, leading Gunn to strike Road Dogg. This allowed Cactus to slowly crawl over and tag in the as yet untagged Austin who came into the ring clotheslining every enemy, knocking the heads of the Outlaws together and delivering a stunner to Road Dogg, allowing him to claim a pin count and win the match, stunning Billy Gunn immediately afterwards. After Stone Cold celebrated, Chyna confronted him and prevented Austin from leaving the ring, but after giving him the finger, Austin gave her the stunner.

Reception
In 2008, J.D. Dunn of 411Mania gave the event a rating of 5.5 [Not So Good], stating, "The wrestling was about par for 1998. There wasn't any angle advancement, and the PPV didn't do anything to set up WrestleMania that wasn't already done on Raw. I can't honestly think of a reason to recommend it, but it's not actively bad.
Thumbs down."

Aftermath
Goldust and Marc Mero would continue to tag for some weeks until the hostility between their valets, Luna Vachon and Sable, respectively, resulted in an in ring brawl. Mero took exception to Goldust grabbing Sable to restrain her and hit Goldust, after which a mixed tag team match was booked for WrestleMania which Sable won after using Mero's TKO on Vachon. Vachon, insistent on humiliating Sable demanded a rematch between just the two of them at Unforgiven, and laid down the stipulation of an evening gown match.

Ken Shamrock would go on to face Rocky Maivia in a singles match at WrestleMania for the Intercontinental Championship. He won the match, making Rock tap out but in his fury he would not let go of the submission hold and thus was disqualified and the title returned to Maivia.

Vader's post-match assault allowed him to take some time off for some much needed surgery while Kane had to refocus his efforts on the resurrected Undertaker. Vader would make his return at Unforgiven while interfering during the first-ever Inferno Match.

Aside from Savio Vega, the members of the main event faced each other in smaller matches at WrestleMania with Cactus Jack and Chainsaw Charlie winning the Tag Team Championships in the first ever dumpster match, although the decision would be upheld and the Outlaws won a rematch resulting in Charlie's departure from the WWF. Owen Hart lost his European Championship to Triple H owing to an ankle injury and some outside interference from Chyna. Similar interference prevented him from retrieving the gold at WrestleMania. Stone Cold Steve Austin would eventually get his hands on Shawn Michaels, who lost his WWF World Heavyweight Championship and had to retire due to his back injury until SummerSlam 2002.

The In Your House branding was retired following February 1999's St. Valentine's Day Massacre: In Your House event, as the company moved to install permanent names for each of its monthly PPVs. After two years, No Way Out returned in February 2000 as its own PPV event and its title was truncated to "No Way Out" as it was not held in Texas. It then continued as the annual February PPV for nine years, during which the WWF was renamed to World Wrestling Entertainment (WWE) in 2002. No Way Out was replaced by Elimination Chamber in 2010, though one further event was produced in 2012 as a one-off event. It was again discontinued and replaced by Payback in 2013.

Results

References

External links
Official website

1998
Events in Houston
In Your House
1998 in Texas
Professional wrestling in Houston
1998 WWF pay-per-view events
February 1998 events in the United States

pl:No Way Out of Texas: In Your House